Pirton may refer to:
Pirton, Hertfordshire
Pirton, Worcestershire

See also 
Purton (disambiguation)